Cimiata or Kimiata was a hill town of ancient Paphlagonia, which gave its name to a division of Paphlagonia named Cimiatene. It was situated at the foot of the Olgassys.

Its site was previously located near Kurmalar, Asiatic Turkey. However, view of new studies and epigraphic survey, this site is probably more located at Asar Tepe, near Deresamail village close to Eskipazar.

References

Populated places in ancient Paphlagonia
Former populated places in Turkey
Roman towns and cities in Turkey
History of Çankırı Province